The César class or Zélé class included two 74-gun ships of the line designed by Joseph Coulomb. They were a development of his earlier 74-gun ship, the Zélé of 1763.

 César
Builder: Toulon
Ordered: 10 March 1767
Launched: 3 August 1768
Fate: Captured and burnt by the British at the Battle of the Saintes, 12 April 1782

 Destin
Builder: Toulon
Ordered: 7 February 1770
Launched: 21 October 1777
Fate: Captured by the British at Toulon in August 1793, and burnt by them there in December 1793

Sources and references

Nomenclature des navires français de 1715 á 1774. Alain Demerliac (Editions Omega, Nice – 1995). .
Winfield, Rif and Roberts, Stephen (2017) French Warships in the Age of Sail 1626-1786: Design, Construction, Careers and Fates. Seaforth Publishing. . 

 
74-gun ship of the line classes
Ship of the line classes from France
Ship classes of the French Navy